Parshall may refer to:

Places in the United States
 Parshall, Colorado
 Parshall, North Dakota
 Parshall Township, North Dakota

People
 George Parshall, organometallic chemist from DuPont Central Research
 Horace Field Parshall, electrical engineer
 Karen Parshall, professor and historian of mathematics
 Ralph L. Parshall, U.S. Bureau of Reclamation, developer of the Parshall flume

pt:Parshall